Aaj Ka Ravan is a 2000 Indian Hindi-language action film directed by Imran Khalid and produced by Surendra Srivastava. It is a revenge drama, with Mithun Chakraborty in the lead role. The film was released on 29 September 2000.

Plot
A journalist who is investigating arms deals and other crimes against the state is shot and killed, so Shanti (Indira Krishna), who is also a journalist, swears that she will bring the culprit Vishtar Nath Mohan Joshi to justice. One night Shanti gets molested, but a man, Shankar (Mithun Chakraborty) comes to her rescue. She tells him everything and makes him her brother by tying a Raakhee.

One day Shanti gives Shankar a roll of film which implicates Vishtar Nath directly in his illegal arms deals. Shankar immediately takes the roll of film to the police commissioner who subsequently destroys it and gets Shankar arrested for having RDX in his car by a rogue and despicable police inspector (Tej Sapru). Shankar is beaten black and blue back at the police station and then in the guise of giving him bail is told he can leave.

As he leaves the police station he is confronted by rogue police officers and Nath's men, tied up and is shot several times and left for dead. He is saved by his now sister Shanti, but then he gets attacked in the hospital by Naths goon Bakra (Kasam Ali). Shankar beats him mercilessly and kills him brutally. This is witnessed by inspector Vikram (Siddarth Dhawan) who tells him that he a "Raavan" (A Devil), and that he's now a killer.

Shankar says he's tried being an angel and a law abiding citizen, but got nothing but humiliation and death threats- so now he's going to be the devil and take down the underworld kingpin Nath. The rest of the film depicts how Shankar takes down the underworld singlehandedly with inspector Vikram hot on his trail, who also loves his sister Shanti.

In all this time taking down the underworld and killing the bad guys, Shankar also has time for falling in love, singing and dancing with his love interest Mona (Meenakshi).

Cast
Mithun Chakraborty as Shankar
 Gajendra Chauhan as A.C.P. Rathore
 Siddharth Dhawan as Inspector Vikram Singh
Mohan Joshi as Vishdhar Nath
Shakti Kapoor
Shalini Kapoor as Ramkali
Kasam Ali as Babbar Bakhra
Javed Khan
Mushtaq Khan as Gul Gulewala (Gullu Malwani)
Indira Krishnan as Shanti
Vinod Kulkarni as Subhash
Meenakshi as Mona
Anil Nagrath as Khilawan
Master Rashid as Munna — Subhash & Saraswathi's son
Tej Sapru as Inspector Raman Khatri
O.P. Sharma
Ashok Verma
Zubeda as Saraswathi — Subhash's wife

Songs
"Haathon Ki Mehendi" - Udit Narayan, Vibha Sharma
"Ho Raja Khele Mera Paan Chaila" - Vinod Rathod, Madhushree
"Jaane Jaa Janam Tu Janeman" - Babul Supriyo, Kavita Krishnamurthy
"Khanka Re Khanka Khangana" - Udit Narayan, Anuradha Paudwal
"Khidki Khule Ya Band" - Babul Supriyo, Poornima
"Ladki Tu Kamal Hai" - Vinod Rathod

References

External links

Full Hyderabad review

2000 films
2000s Hindi-language films
Mithun's Dream Factory films
Films shot in Ooty
Indian action films
2000 action films